Set Free is an album by The American Analog Set.  It was released on September 20, 2005, on Arts & Crafts.  This album was chosen as one of Amazon.com's Top 100 Editor's Picks of 2005.

Track listing

References

External links 
 Set Free at Discogs

2005 albums
The American Analog Set albums
Arts & Crafts Productions albums
Morr Music albums